Louis Bendixen (born 23 June 1995) is a Danish cyclist, who currently rides for UCI ProTeam .

Major results

2017
 9th Fyen Rundt
2019
 4th Overall Dookoła Mazowsza
2020
 5th Time trial, National Road Championships
 7th Hafjell GP
2021
 1st Puchar Ministra Obrony Narodowej
 4th International Rhodes Grand Prix
2022
 1st  Overall International Tour of Rhodes
1st Stages 1 & 2
 5th Road race, National Road Championships

References

External links

1995 births
Living people
Danish male cyclists
Cyclists from Copenhagen